

About 
The University of Bijeljina is a private university, established in 2011 by the College of Health Care Bijeljina, based on the Consent of the Ministry of Education and Culture of the Republika Srpska in 2011 in Bijeljina in the Republika Srpska, BiH.

Organization 
The University has 4300m2 of space within which the University has 4 amphitheaters, 5 classrooms with a total of 600 seats. Students also have at their disposal one computer room with a total of 20 networked computers, and a reading room. Teachers, associates and the administration have 12 cabinets, and offices. The amphitheaters have their own sound system, and all classrooms have the conditions for Internet access and teaching through video projections. In addition to the above, the University has 9 laboratories intended for performing exercises for students of pharmacy and agriculture. Within the university there is also a Center for psychological counseling of young people.

See also
 List of universities in Bosnia and Herzegovina

References

Bijeljina
Universities in Bosnia and Herzegovina
Educational institutions established in 2011
Serbian schools outside Serbia
2011 establishments in Serbia